Yanping may refer to:

Modern locations
 Yanping District, a district in Nanping, Fujian, China
 Yanping, the former romanization of Enping in Guangdong, China
 Yanping Township, a township in Taitung County, Taiwan
 Taipei Private Yan Ping High School, a high school in Taipei, Taiwan

History
 Prince of Yanping, a title held by 
 Koxinga (1624–1662), a leader of the Ming resistance during the rise of the Qing
 Zheng Jing
 Zheng Keshuang
 Kingdom of Yanping, another name for the Ming successor state of Tungning on Taiwan

Historical eras
Yanping (106), era name used by Emperor Shang of Han
Yanping (397), era name used by Murong Lin, self-proclaimed emperor of Later Yan

People
Yan Ying, a statesman of the state of Qi, who was also known as Yan Pingzhong